Solitude, Dominance, Tragedy is the second studio album by Swedish progressive metal band Evergrey. It was released on 17 May 1999 through Gothenburg Noiseworks/Hall of Sermon. It was re-issued and re-released in 2004 via Inside Out Music, and in 2017 via AFM Records. Recording sessions took place at Los Angered Recordings in Gothenburg from February to April 1999. Production was handled by Andy LaRocque and Evergrey themselves. It is the last album to feature original bassist Daniel Nojd and guitarist Dan Bronell.

Track listing

Personnel
Evergrey
Tom S. Englund – vocals, guitars, lyrics, keyboards arrangement, producer
Daniel Nojd – backing vocals, bass, lyrics (tracks: 4-6), keyboards arrangement, producer
Dan Bronell – guitars, lyrics (tracks: 4-6), keyboards arrangement, producer
Patrick Carlsson – drums, lyrics (tracks: 4-6), keyboards arrangement, producer

Additional credits
Carina Kjellberg – female vocals, choir arrangement
The Mercury Choir – choir
Erik Ask – harp
Stuart Wyatt – six-string violin
Zachary Stephens – keyboards
Anders Allhage – mixing, engineering, producer
Kristian "Rizza" Isaksson – additional technician
Kristian Wåhlin – cover
Samuel Durling – cover
Kenneth Johansson – photography

References

External links

1999 albums
Evergrey albums